Anton Antonovich Skalon (Russian - Антон Антонович Скалон; 6 September 1767, in Biysk fortress – 1812) was a Russian commander during the Napoleonic Wars, rising to the rank of major general in the Imperial Russian Army. He was a descendant of the French Huguenot George de Skalon, whose sons Stepan and Daniel had moved to Russia in 1710.

Skalon was killed on 5 August 1812 in the Battle of Smolensk. He and his regiment of dragoons, combined with a detachment of cossacks, were in the Rachenskoe suburb. Aiming to prevent the French attack, Skalon attacked quickly but was killed on the spot and his force pushed into retreat. His body fell into enemy hands and at Napoleon's personal command it was buried with full military honours three days after the French occupation of Smolensk.

External links
Museum.ru

Russian people of French descent
1767 births
1812 deaths
Russian commanders of the Napoleonic Wars
Military personnel killed in the Napoleonic Wars